Hymenaea courbaril, the courbaril or West Indian locust, is a tree common in the Caribbean, Central America, and South America. It is a hardwood that is used for furniture, flooring, and decoration. Its hard fruit pods have edible dry pulp surrounding the seeds. Its sap, called animé, is used for incense, perfume, and varnish.

Names
Hymenaea courbaril is commonly known as the "courbaril", "West Indian locust", "Brazilian copal", and "amami-gum", and "Jatobá".

Although it is sometimes referred to as "Brazilian cherry" and "South American cherry", it is not a cherry tree but a legume of the family Fabaceae. It is also known as "stinking toe", "old man's toe", and "stinktoe" because of the unpleasant odor of the edible pulp of its seed pods.

Fruit
Its fruit, also known as locust, was a major food for indigenous peoples. Those who eat it do not consider the odor unpleasant. The pulp, in spite of its somewhat disagreeable odor, has a sweet taste; is consumed raw; may be dried and transformed into powder to be incorporated into cookies, crackers, and soups; and may be mixed with water to prepare a drink called "atole".  The pulp inside the hard shells appears like miniature soluble fibers that dissolve easily in water or milk, which it thickens. Some add sugar to it for more sweetness. If consumed raw it tends to stick inside the mouth like dry dust. It is one of the richest vegetable foods known because of its high concentrations of starches and proteins. It is further an excellent concentrated feed for animals.

Animé
The tree produces an orange, soft, sticky resin or gum, called "animé" (French for "animated", in reference to its insect-infested natural state). The resin has a specific gravity varying from 1.054 to 1.057. It melts readily over fire, and softens even with the heat of the mouth. It diffuses white fumes and a very pleasant odor. Insects are generally entrapped in it in large numbers. It is insoluble in water, and nearly so in cold alcohol. It is similar to copal in its nature and appearance, and a copal from Zanzibar is sometimes given this name.

The production of animé may be encouraged by wounding the bark. The resin collects between the principal roots. It can be obtained from other species of Hymenaea growing in tropical South America.

Brazilians use it internally to treat diseases of the lungs. It was formerly an ingredient of ointments and plasters, but at present its only use is for incense and varnish.

Wood
For comparison, Douglas fir measures , white oak , and Brazilian walnut  on the Janka scale. It features a tan to salmon color with black accent stripes that over time turn to a deep and vibrant red.

Notes

References
 

Attribution:

External links
 
 

courbaril
Trees of Central America
Trees of South America
Trees of Peru
Trees of the Caribbean
Trees of the Dominican Republic
Flora of the Dominican Republic
Hardwood forest plants
Trees of Îles des Saintes
Plants described in 1753
Taxa named by Carl Linnaeus
Flora without expected TNC conservation status